Return of the Ugly is the sixth studio album by British 2 Tone and ska band Bad Manners, released in 1989 (see 1989 in music). It was the band's first release on an independent label and their first album release without David Farren, Brian Tuitt, Andy Marson and Paul Hyman.

Track listing

 All songs by Bad Manners unless noted.

 "Skaville UK" – 2:33
 "Sally Brown" (Laurel Aitken) – 2:35
 "Since You've Gone Away" – 3:29
 "Rosemary" – 2:20
 "Bonanza Ska" (Ray Evans, Jay Livingston) – 4:10
 "Return of the Ugly" – 2:54
 "Hey Little Girl" (Aitken) – 3:50
 "Buffalo Ska"  – 2:42
 "Memory Train" – 2:58
 "This Is Ska" (Long) – 2:42

Personnel
Buster Bloodvessel – Lead Vocals & Production
Louis Alphonso – Guitar
Martin Stewart – Keyboards
Winston Bazoomies – Harmonica
Chris Kane – Tenor Saxophone
Alan Perry – Alto Saxophone
Nicky Welsh – Bass
Ian Fullwood – Tenor Saxophone
Jan Brahms – Trombone
Jon Preston – Trumpet
Perry Melius – Drums
Longsy D – Additional Drums & Additional Production

1989 albums
Bad Manners albums
Blue Beat Records albums